O Contador de Histórias (The Story of Me or (Australian title) The Storyteller) is a 2009 Brazilian film directed by Luiz Villaça, based on the life of Roberto Carlos Ramos, a Brazilian teacher and storyteller brought up in a state educational institution for poor children.

Plot
Roberto, an imaginative 6-year-old and the youngest of ten brothers in an impoverished family, is consigned by his mother to a newly founded government institution. The goal of educating poor youngsters to university level is not matched by the facilities, and the unhappy Roberto repeatedly tries to escape and is brought back. A French social-work researcher, Margherit, makes the boy, who is now aged 13 and on the way to a life of crime, a subject of study. After many tribulations, she gets closer to him and shows how love and care can make a difference. She teaches him to read and introduces works of Jules Verne which refire his imagination and launch him on a successful career of teaching and public oratory.

Cast
Maria de Medeiros as Margherit
Daniel Henrique as 6-year-old Roberto 
Paulinho Mendes as 13-year-old Roberto
Cleiton Santos as adult Roberto
Malu Galli as Pérola
Ju Colombo as Roberto's mother
Daniel Henrique da Silva as 6-year-old Samuel
Ricardo Perpétuo as 13-year-old Samuel
Matheus de Freitas as 13-year-old Cabelinho de Fogo
Victor Augusto da Silva as 17-year-old Cabelinho de Fogo
Teuda Bara as Judith
Chico Díaz as camelô
Jacqueline Obrigon as psychologist

Reception
In 2009, adjudged Best Film (Audience Choice), Critics’ Special Prize and Best Actor at Paulínia Festival; Lente de Cristal Award at Cine Fest Brasil, Madrid.  Also screened at Vienna International Children's Festival, 2010 Brazilian Film Festival of London; Brazilian Film Festival in Miami.

References

External links

Brazilian director tells real story behind movie at YouTube, 28 November 2011

2009 films
Brazilian drama films
2000s Portuguese-language films
2009 drama films